Patrick Dalton (second ¼  – death unknown) was an English professional rugby league footballer who played in the 1930s and 1940s.

Background
Paddy Dalton's birth was registered in Harrington, Cumberland, England.

Playing career

International honours
Paddy Dalton won caps for England while at Salford in 1934 against Australia and France, in 1935 against France and Wales, and in 1936 against Wales, and represented English League XIII against France.

Challenge Cup Final appearances
Paddy Dalton played right-, i.e. number 12, in Salford's 7-4 victory over Barrow in the 1937–38 Challenge Cup Final during the 1937–38 season at Wembley Stadium, London, in front of a crowd of 51,243.

County Cup Final appearances
About Paddy Dalton's time, there was Salford's 10-8 victory over Swinton in the 1931–32 Lancashire County Cup Final during the 1931–32 season at The Cliff, Broughton, Salford on Saturday 21 November 1931, the 21-12 victory over Wigan in the 1934–35 Lancashire County Cup Final during the 1934–35 season at Station Road, Swinton on Saturday 20 October 1934, the 15-7 victory over Wigan in the 1935–36 Lancashire County Cup Final during the 1935–36 season at Wilderspool Stadium, Warrington on Saturday 19 October 1935, the 5-2 victory over Wigan in the 1936–37 Lancashire County Cup Final during the 1936–37 season at Wilderspool Stadium, Warrington on Saturday 17 October 1936, and he played left-, i.e. number 11, in the 7-10 defeat by Wigan in the 1938–39 Lancashire County Cup Final during the 1938–39 season at Station Road, Swinton on Saturday 22 October 1938.

Les Diables Rouges
Paddy Dalton was one of the players who successfully toured in France with Salford in 1934, during which the Salford team earned the name "Les Diables Rouges", the seventeen players were; Joe Bradbury, Bob Brown, Aubrey Casewell, Paddy Dalton, Bert Day, Cliff Evans, Jack Feetham, George Harris, Barney Hudson, Emlyn Jenkins, Alf Middleton, Sammy Miller, Harold Osbaldestin, Les Pearson, Gus Risman, Billy Watkins and Billy Williams.

References

External links

1907 births
England national rugby league team players
English rugby league players
People from Harrington, Cumbria
Place of death missing
Rugby league locks
Rugby league players from Cumbria
Rugby league second-rows
Rugby League XIII players
Salford Red Devils players
Year of death missing